Russell John Northe (born 6 February 1966) is a former Australian politician and a former member of the Victorian Legislative Assembly. Prior to winning preselection by The Nationals for the seat of Morwell, he was a local Australian rules footballer. He resigned from The Nationals in August 2017, and served the rest of his time in office as an independent member of parliament. Following Northe's retirement at the 2022 state election, National member Martin Cameron won Northe's previous seat of Morwell.

Early life and education
Northe was born in Traralgon, Victoria and attended Traralgon High School, completing Year 11 in 1982. In 2006, Northe completed a Certificate IV in Business.

Political and parliamentary career
With repetitive television advertising and campaigning on the issues of workers' rights and bicycle paths, Northe was able to capitalise on divisions within some local branches of the Labor Party to win the seat. Northe doubled the Nationals' primary vote, secured with the aid of Liberal Party and ex-Labor independent preferences.

This win also served to help secure the Nationals' future as a political party in Victoria. Russell Northe joined fellow parliamentarians Peter Ryan and Peter Hall as the Nationals' state parliamentary representatives for Gippsland.

At the 2010 state election, Northe achieved the biggest pro-Coalition swing in the state to transform Morwell into one of the National Party's safest Victorian seats, with a two-party-preferred margin of 16.29% against Labor. Northe won Morwell on the primary vote, polling 56.24% in his own right, and won every polling booth except the small Yallourn North booth, where Labor recorded a narrow majority. With the Liberal/Nationals Coalition winning government, Northe was also appointed as Parliamentary Secretary for Small Business.

In 2014, Northe was elevated to Cabinet as Minister for Energy and Resources and Minister for Small Business. He held those ministerial portfolios until the defeat of the Napthine/Ryan Coalition Government at the 2014 state election. After the election defeat and the resignation of long-serving Nationals leader Peter Ryan, Northe pursued the party deputy leadership, but lost to first-term MP Steph Ryan.

On 28 August 2017, Northe resigned from the National Party due to stress, depression and gambling issues. According to media reports, he had accrued significant debts exceeding $750,000 owed to over thirty local businessmen, friends, constituents party members, and his own parliamentary leader Peter Walsh, partly due to gambling. Those who were persuaded by Northe to lend him money were said to include former employees in his electorate office and a retrenched power station worker who lost a large portion of his redundancy package. Northe was narrowly re-elected at the 2018 state election, achieving 19.6% of the primary vote, but receiving enough preferences from the Liberal and National Parties to defeat the Labor candidate with a two-party preferred vote of 51.8%. He pledged to be a "conservative independent" member.

External links
 Official Website
 Parliamentary voting record of Russell Northe at Victorian Parliament Tracker
 Rural & Regional Committee – Parliament of Victoria

References

1966 births
Living people
Members of the Victorian Legislative Assembly
National Party of Australia members of the Parliament of Victoria
Independent members of the Parliament of Victoria
Traralgon Football Club players
People from Traralgon
21st-century Australian politicians